This is a list of former state parks in Texas, United States, the year they were established and what they reverted to.

See also
List of Texas state parks

References

 Texas state parks 2
Former state parks